Bosley Yu Yang (born 10 January 2001) is a Hong Kong professional footballer who currently plays as a midfielder for Southern League Premier Division South club Dorchester Town U21.

Honours
Kitchee
 Hong Kong Premier League: 2019–20
 Hong Kong Senior Shield: 2018–19
 Hong Kong FA Cup: 2018–19
 Hong Kong Sapling Cup: 2019–20

References

External links
Bosley Yu at HKFA

2001 births
Living people
Hong Kong footballers
Hong Kong expatriate footballers
Association football midfielders
Southern District FC players
Kitchee SC players
Hong Kong Premier League players
Expatriate footballers in England
Hong Kong expatriate sportspeople in England